= Plantation, Lexington =

Neighborhood in Lexington, Kentucky

Coordinates: 37.998°N 84.573°W

Plantation is a neighborhood in southwestern Lexington, Kentucky, United States. It is bounded by Man O War Boulevard, Harrodsburg Road, and Old Higbee Mill Road.

Neighborhood statistics

- Area: 0.381 square miles (0.99 km^{2})
- Population: 1,322
- Population density: 3,466 people per square mile
- Median household income: $85,047
